Giovanna Marini (born Giovanna Salviucci; 19 January 1937) is an Italian singer-songwriter and researcher of ethnomusicology.

Biography
She was born in Rome in a family of musicians. In 1959 she obtained her diploma in classical guitar at the Conservatorio Santa Cecilia. In early 1960s she began personally to know some Italian intellectuals and researchers of popular tradition, such as Pier Paolo Pasolini, Dario Fo, Italo Calvino and others. A communist, during her long musical career she became famous for her lyrics (many of them sung by Paolo Pietrangeli), embracing the themes of the Italian '68 period and other political and social issues. From 1991 to 2002 she taught ethnomusicology in the University of Vincennes (Paris-VIII).

Awards
 1999 – Targa Tenco: best singer (with Francesco De Gregori) for Il fischio del vapore

Discography

EP and 45 rpm

1963: Lu picurare - canzoni popolari abruzzesi (45 rpm)
1965: La disispirata - canzoni popolari sarde (45 rpm)
1967: Ciò che voi non-dite/La linea rossa (EP, with I.Della Mea)
1977: Ho bisogno di te/Se si sa di volare (EP)

33 rpm

1965: Le canzoni di Bella ciao
1966: Vi parlo dell'America
1967: Chiesa Chiesa
1968: Lunga vita allo spettacolo. Viva Voltaire e Montesquieu
1971: Controcanale '70
1972: La Nave. La Creatora
1969: La vivazione
1974: L'eroe (ballata nuova)
1975: I treni per Reggio Calabria
1978: Correvano coi carri
1979: La grande madre impazzita 1
1979: La grande madre impazzita 2
1980: Cantate de tous les jours
1982: Cantate de tous les jours vol. 2
1983: Quatuor vocal
1984: Le cadeau de l'empereur
1985: Pour Pier Paolo
1986: Requiem.Cantata delle cinque stanze

CD

1996: Oresteia Aischylos (Igloo)
1998: Musiche di scena
1999: Si bemolle
2002: Il fischio del vapore (with Francesco De Gregori)
2003: Buongiorno e buonasera
2004: Passioni
2005: Nostra patria è il mondo intero 
2006: Antologia

See also
Nuovo Canzoniere Italiano

References

External links

 Official site of Giovanna Marini

1937 births
Living people
Italian singer-songwriters
Italian folk singers
Singers from Rome
Italian ethnomusicologists
Italian communists
Academic staff of Paris 8 University Vincennes-Saint-Denis
Igloo Records artists
Italian musicians